Lesnovo Hill (‘Halm Lesnovo’ \'h&lm le-'sno-vo) is the mostly ice-covered hill rising to 1286 m at the west extremity of Care Heights in Rouen Mountains, northern Alexander Island in Antarctica. It surmounts Nichols Snowfield to the west.  The hill was visited on 28 January 1988 by the geological survey team of Christo Pimpirev and Borislav Kamenov (First Bulgarian Antarctic Expedition), and Philip Nell and Peter Marquis (British Antarctic Survey).

The feature is named after the settlement of Lesnovo in Western Bulgaria.

Location

Maps
 British Antarctic Territory. Scale 1:200000 topographic map. DOS 610 – W 69 70. Tolworth, UK, 1971
 Antarctic Digital Database (ADD). Scale 1:250000 topographic map of Antarctica. Scientific Committee on Antarctic Research (SCAR). Since 1993, regularly upgraded and updated

Notes

References
 Bulgarian Antarctic Gazetteer. Antarctic Place-names Commission. (details in Bulgarian, basic data in English)
 Lesnovo Hill. SCAR Composite Gazetteer of Antarctica

External links
 Lesnovo Hill. Copernix satellite image

Landforms of Alexander Island
Bulgaria and the Antarctic